La Vibora (The Viper) is a steel bobsled roller coaster at Six Flags Over Texas in Arlington, Texas, United States.

History
The ride's cars do not run on conventional tubular rails, but instead travel through a winding half-pipe trough that emulates the experience of riding a bobsled. In keeping with the Texas location the theme was changed from an alpine bobsled ride to a snake theme. The name La Vibora translated to English is The Viper. 
The coaster's life began at Six Flags Magic Mountain under the name Sarajevo Bobsleds, being named in honor of the 1984 olympics and the ride opened that same year. However, the ride was part of Six Flags' (now defunct) Ride Rotation Program, and the coaster lasted two seasons at Magic Mountain and closed in 1985. That same year the ride ceased operation, the plot of land where the bobsleds stood was reused and housed Batman The Escape (known as Shockwave at Magic Mountain), another roller coaster manufactured by Intamin and the ride was relocated to Six Flags Over Texas and opened as the Avalanche Bobsled in 1986. The ride was later renamed La Vibora and painted to resemble a snake to better match the theme of the Spain section of the park.

The karts/trains that ride on La Vibora are originally from the Bob Track in Efteling.

Roller coasters operated by Six Flags
Steel roller coasters
Roller coasters manufactured by Intamin
Roller coasters introduced in 1987
Roller coasters in Texas
Six Flags Magic Mountain
Former roller coasters in California
Six Flags Over Texas
1987 establishments in Texas
Roller coasters introduced in 1984